Antispila  is a moth genus of the family Heliozelidae. It was described by Jacob Hübner in 1825.

Species
 Antispila ampelopsia
 Antispila ampelopsifoliella
 Antispila argentifera
 Antispila argostoma
 Antispila aristarcha
 Antispila aurirubra
 Antispila chlorosema
 Antispila cleyerella
 Antispila corniella
 Antispila cornifoliella
 Antispila cyclosema
 Antispila distyliella
 Antispila eugeniella
 Antispila freemani
 Antispila hikosana
 Antispila hydrangaeella
 Antispila hydrangifoliella
 Antispila inouei
 Antispila isabella
 Antispila isorrhythma
 Antispila iviella
 Antispila kunyuensis
 Antispila merinaella
 Antispila mesogramma
 Antispila metallella
 Antispila nolckeni
 Antispila nysaefoliella
 Antispila oinophylla
 Antispila orbiculella
 Antispila orthodelta
 Antispila pentalitha
 Antispila postscripta
 Antispila praecincta
 Antispila purplella
 Antispila tateshinensis
 Antispila treitschkiella
 Antispila trypherantis
 Antispila uenoi
 Antispila viticordifoliella
 Antispila voraginella

Former species
 Antispila anna
 Antispila argyrozona
 Antispila micrarcha
 Antispila pariodelta
 Antispila salutans
 Antispila selastis

Undescribed species

Status unknown
 Antispila grimmella (Hübner, 1824), described as Tinea grimella. Type location is Europe.
 Antispila jurinella (Hübner, 1811/1817), described as Tinea jurinella. Type location is Europe.

References

Heliozelidae
Adeloidea genera